is a Japanese table tennis player. Winner of the 2006 World Junior Championships in singles, he was the world number one junior player in 2008. He is world-renowned for his tomahawk serve, which he has popularized throughout his career. The serve itself is rather unorthodox but still ample in efficiency, making it even more effective due to its unfamiliar nature. His serve has been one of the imperative factors in his illustrious junior career, alongside making him a top 50 player for many years. He also utilizes its reverse variation.

Matsudaira became well known on the world stage after his match against the Olympic champion Ma Lin at the 2009 World Table Tennis Championships, where he demonstrated his advanced tomahawk serves, compact and explosive technique, alongside his dynamic backhand control. He won two straight games from a 1–3 deficit and held the lead at 4–1 in the seventh (he lost the set 11–9). Later, he beat Ma 4–1 at the 2013 World Table Tennis Championships in the Round of 64. After progressing to the Round of 16 and beating Vladimir Samsonov 4–3, he lost in the quarter-finals to the bronze medalist, Xu Xin, in 6 games. This is regarded as his best performance in his adult career and was considered to have performed the best out of all of the non-Chinese players. He is ranked 17 in the world as of January, 2017.

References

Living people
Japanese male table tennis players
1991 births
Asian Games medalists in table tennis
Table tennis players at the 2010 Asian Games
Table tennis players at the 2014 Asian Games
Table tennis players at the 2018 Asian Games
Asian Games bronze medalists for Japan
Medalists at the 2010 Asian Games
Medalists at the 2014 Asian Games
World Table Tennis Championships medalists
Kinoshita Meister Tokyo players
People from Nanao, Ishikawa